LEGO is a proof assistant developed by Randy Pollack at the University of Edinburgh. It implements several type theories: the Edinburgh Logical Framework (LF), the Calculus of Constructions (CoC), the Generalized Calculus of Constructions (GCC) and the Unified Theory of Dependent Types (UTT).

References

External links 
 

Proof assistants
Dependently typed languages